46th Street may refer to the following New York City Subway stations in Brooklyn and Queens:

46th Street (IND Queens Boulevard Line); serving the  trains
46th Street – Bliss Street (IRT Flushing Line); serving the  train
46th Street (BMT Fifth Avenue Line); demolished